General elections will be held in Papua New Guinea at some point in or before 2027 to elect members of the National Parliament.

The Pangu Pati, led by incumbent Prime Minister James Marape, will be seeking re-election, opposed by the People's National Congress (PNC), led by former Prime Minister Peter O'Neill.

Background
At the previous elections in 2022 the Pangu Pati, led by James Marape, won 39 seats, gaining 30 seats, in a landslide victory. However, no party won a majority of seats, which is common in Papua New Guinean elections.

Electoral system
The 124 members of the National Parliament are elected from single-member constituencies by limited instant-runoff voting; voters are given up to three preferences, with a candidate declared elected once they received over 50% of preference votes. Of the 124 members, 102 are elected from "open" seats (increased from 96 in the 2022 elections), with the remainder elected from "provincial" seats based on the twenty provinces, the Autonomous Region of Bougainville and the National Capital District. The winners of the provincial seats also become the provincial governor.

Campaign
Along with common key issues such as crime, employment and poverty, one specific issue for debate will be the status of the Autonomous Region of Bougainville, where 98% of the population voted for independence in a 2019 referendum. Bougainville is expected to achieve independence by 2027 if an agreement is ratified by the National Parliament.

References

Elections in Papua New Guinea
Future elections in Oceania